Hell:on is a Ukrainian thrash/death metal band formed in 2005 in Zaporizhzhia, eastern Ukraine  by Oleksiy Pasko and Oleh Talanov. lyrics of the band generally deals with mysticism, philosophy and anti-religion. Hell:on has ranked among the top bands in the Ukraine metal scene. At the recording of the last three albums the band has worked with Jeff Waters, Andy LaRocque, Marek Pajak, Andreas Kisser. Started from 2006, band played numerous live shows around all Europe, mostly in Poland, Czech Republic, Slovakia, Hungary and Germany. During the creative activity, the band recorded five full-length albums and one DVD.

Discography

Studio albums
 2005 - Hellion (demo, self-released)
 2006 - Strong Enough (Moon Records)
 2007 - Beyond the Fake (EP, self-released)
 2008 - Re:Born (Comp Music/EMI)
 2009 - In the Shadow of Emptiness (EP, self-released)
 2011 - Strong Enough (re-released, Nocturnus records)
 2011 - Re:Born (re-released, Metal Scrap records)
 2012 - Age of Oblivion (Metal Scrap records)
 2013 - Hunt (Ferrrum.com) (re-mastered 2020)
 2015 - Decade of Hell (digital compilation)
 2015 - Once Upon a Chaos (Ferrrum.com)
 2019 - A Glimpse Beyond (EP) (The Crawling Chaos Records)
 2020 - Scythian Stamm (Hell Serpent Music)

DVD
 2009 - Hell Damage road (WIMP records)

Current members
Oleksiy Pasko - guitars
Anton Vorozhtsov - guitar
Oleksandr Sitalo - bass
Oleh Talanov - drums
Oleksandr Baiev - vocals

Past members
Anton Pavlenko - guitars

References

External links
 
 Hell:on on facebook.com
 Hell:on on metal-archives.com

Ukrainian musical groups
Ukrainian death metal musical groups
Musical groups established in 2005